Martin Fisk (born 28 April 1946 in London) is an English actor.

Initially he worked as a lorry driver for Rowntrees Mackintosh before become an actor. Whilst at RADA, he met his wife, Diane (who was studying on a stage management course). After his graduation in 1971, they were married.

After leaving Newcastle's University Theatre in 1975, the pair went to London where Fisk became a recognised face when playing a truck driver in a series of commercials for Yorkie chocolate bar. However, he was let go when it turned out he was more popular than the product itself. Nevertheless, the actor was able to find work in many TV shows including:

Poldark in 1975 
Thriller: The Next Victim (1976)
A Horseman Riding By in 1978, starring Nigel Havers, and was released on DVD in 2004
Doctor Who: The Leisure Hive (1980)
Miss Marple dramatisation of The Moving Finger in 1985

References

External links 

Martin Fisk at Theatricalia

English male television actors
1946 births
20th-century English male actors
Male actors from London
Living people
Alumni of RADA